The 1990 Big West Conference men's basketball tournament was held March 7–10 at the Long Beach Arena in Long Beach, California.

Defending champions UNLV defeated fifth-seeded  in the final, 92–72, and captured their sixth PCAA/Big West championship. This was the Runnin' Rebels' sixth title in eight seasons.

UNLV, in turn, received an automatic bid to the 1990 NCAA tournament, which they would go on to win. Fellow Big West members New Mexico State and UC Santa Barbara received at-large bids.

Format
There were no changes to the tournament format from 1989. All ten conference members participated in the field, with teams seeded in the bracket based on regular season conference records.

The top six seeds were given a bye into the quarterfinal round while the four lowest-seeded teams were placed into an initial preliminary round.

Bracket

References

Big West Conference men's basketball tournament
Tournament
Big West Conference men's basketball tournament
Big West Conference men's basketball tournament